is a Japanese master of Shotokan karate. He won the IAKF world championship Kumite title in 1983, and he was twice JKA All-Japan kumite champion. He became the national coach of Japan.

Competition

Major Tournament Success
4th IAKF World Karate Championship (1983) -  - 1st Place Kumite
27th JKA All Japan Karate Championship (1984) - 1st Place Kumite
26th JKA All Japan Karate Championship (1983) - 1st Place Kumite

References

 

Japanese male karateka
Karate coaches
Martial arts writers
Shotokan practitioners
Sportspeople from Tokyo
Living people
Year of birth missing (living people)